Predrag Ranđelović may refer to:

 Predrag Ranđelović (footballer, born 1976), Serbian footballer
 Predrag Ranđelović (footballer, born 1990), Serbian-born Macedonia footballer